Hilton Hotels & Resorts (formerly known as Hilton Hotels) is a global brand of full-service hotels and resorts and the flagship brand of American multinational hospitality company Hilton.

The original company was founded by Conrad Hilton. As of December 30, 2019, 584 Hilton Hotels & Resorts properties with 216,379 rooms in 94 countries and territories are located across six continents. This includes 61 properties that are owned or leased with 219,264 rooms, 272 that are managed with 119,612 rooms, and 251 that are franchised with 77,451 rooms. In 2020, Fortune magazine ranked Hilton Hotels & Resorts at number one on their Fortune List of the Top 100 Companies to Work For in 2020 based on an employee survey of satisfaction.

Overview

 

Hilton Hotels & Resorts is Hilton's flagship brand and one of the largest hotel brands in the world. The brand is targeted at both business and leisure travelers with locations in major city centers, near airports, convention centers, and popular vacation destinations around the world.

Hilton Hotels & Resorts participates in Hilton Honors, Hilton's guest-loyalty program. Members who book directly through Hilton-owned channels receive exclusive discounts and amenities such as free Wi-Fi, digital check-in, keyless entry, and the ability to use a mobile app to choose specific rooms.

Notable events
 Conrad Hilton founded the hotel chain in 1919, when he bought his first property, the Mobley Hotel, in Cisco, Texas.
 The first hotel to bear the Hilton name was the Dallas Hilton, a high-rise that opened in Dallas, Texas, in 1925.
 In 1954, at the Caribe Hilton Hotel's Beachcomber Bar in San Juan, Puerto Rico, Ramon "Monchito" Marrero reportedly created the Piña Colada.
In June 1955, Hilton opened the first post–World War II property in Istanbul, Turkey, and it is the longest operating Hilton Hotel outside the United States.
 The Conrad Hilton Hotel in Chicago figured prominently in the 1968 Democratic Convention police riot that occurred on Michigan Avenue and across the street in Grant Park on August 28. During the riot the demonstrators took up the chant "The whole world is watching", and the hotel's doors were locked for the first time in its history. The hotel suffered minor damage as a result of the violence, and a couple of street-level windows gave way under the weight of dozens of protesters being pushed up against them by the police.
 John Lennon and Yoko Ono held their first Bed-In for Peace between March 25 and 31, 1969, at the Amsterdam Hilton, in Room 902 (renumbered to Room 702 during renovation). This room became a popular tourist destination.
 In the London Hilton bombing of September 1975, a bomb exploded in the lobby of the London Hilton on Park Lane, killing two people and injuring 63.
 With construction on the Beirut Hilton finished, the hotel was scheduled to open on April 14, 1975, but the Lebanese Civil War erupted exactly one day before the April 13 Grand Opening date. The hotel never opened and was severely damaged during the war, and the building was demolished in the late 1990s. However, a different hotel was established later, under the name "Hilton Beirut Grand Habtoor", in the nearby eastern suburb. Later on, the Hilton Chain bought the Metropolitan hotel directly facing the Grand Habtoor and renamed it "Hilton Metropolitan".
 On February 13, 1978, the Sydney Hilton Hotel was the site of one of the few terrorist incidents on Australian soil, when a bomb blast killed three people (two council workers and a policeman).
 The Hilton Nicosia in Nicosia, Cyprus, was the scene of the assassination of Youssef Sebai, an Egyptian newspaper editor and friend of Egyptian President Anwar El Sadat, on February 19, 1978. The assassination and the hijacking of a Cyprus Airways DC-8 at Larnaca Airport led to the Egyptian raid on Larnaca International Airport by Egyptian forces. The intervention by the Egyptians led to the deterioration of relations between Cyprus and Egypt.
 In 1989, Hilton established the Hilton Honors program, Hilton's guest-loyalty program.
 A commercial space station project known as Space Islands was proposed by Hilton International in 1999 to be constructed from used Space Shuttle fuel tanks.  When completed, it was to be called the Hilton Orbital Hotel. The tanks were to be connected together to form a ring, resulting in a space station similar to that pictured in the film 2001: A Space Odyssey. Plans were also drawn up for a 5000-room hotel on the Moon, though Steve Hilton noted in 2009 that both these plans were more symbolic than practical at this stage.
 On October 24, 1999, the four double columns of the left-hand side of the then modern Barbados Hilton in Needham's Point, St. Michael, was collapsed and imploded inwards in just 10 to 15 seconds when the earthquake had rocked Barbados. It was later demolished in May 2005 after they constructed the new Barbados Hilton in January 2005.
 In 2004, Hilton Hotels opened their new Kuala Lumpur property in KL Sentral, directly opposite the main entrance to the Sentral Terminal, as the replacement for their former premises in Jalan Sultan Ismail. The latter was the first internationally run hotel in the city when opening in 1973, and changed management in 2002 (renamed Crowne Plaza Mutiara) before being demolished in 2015 for a (currently on hold) mixed-use development.
 In 2009, the company relocated its global headquarters from Beverly Hills, California, to McLean, Virginia.
 In 2009, Hilton opened Canada's tallest hotel at 58 stories, in Niagara Falls, Ontario.
 In late 2010, Hilton announced a name change of the Hilton Hotels brand to Hilton Hotels & Resorts along with a new logo design, as part of a rebranding effort for the flagship brand.
 In March 2013, Hilton announced that it would be entering Burma for the first time with the construction of a 300-room hotel in Yangon.
 In 2015, approximately 20 Hilton Hotels & Resorts properties were inducted into the Historic Hotels of America organization. Among these hotels were Hilton Fort Worth, which hosted John F. Kennedy's final speech, and Hilton Hawaiian Village Waikiki Beach Resort, the setting of the film Blue Hawaii.
 In 2016, Hilton N’Djamena opened in Chad. It was the brand's first property in the country and the 100th country Hilton began operations in worldwide.
 In June 2016, Hilton opened their first hotel in Estonia and in the Baltic states.
 In 2017, Hilton announced that it would remain the sponsor for McLaren until 2021. Hilton was one of the oldest sponsors of F1 series and sponsored McLaren since 2005.
 In October 2017, Hilton announced it had committed a total of $50m (£37.8m) over five years to its Hilton Africa Growth Initiative to support the continued expansion of its Sub-Saharan African portfolio.
 In March 2018, Hilton opened their first hotel in Serbia. It is a four-star hotel located in Belgrade.
 In late 2019, Hilton opened their first hotel in Gulshan, Dhaka, Bangladesh. It was designed by Mustapha Khalid Palash.

See also
 Hyatt
 Sheraton Hotels and Resorts

References

External links

 

 
1919 establishments in Texas
Companies based in McLean, Virginia
Hilton Worldwide
Hotels established in 1919